John William Goddard (born 8 September 1947) is a retired former bishop of the Church of England. From 2000 to 2014, he was Bishop of Burnley, a suffragan bishop in the Diocese of Blackburn. He left the Church of England and was received into the Roman Catholic Church in 2021. He was ordained deacon on Tuesday 29 March 2022 and priest on Saturday 2 April 2022 by Bishop Tom Williams in the Metropolitan Cathedral of Christ the King, Liverpool.

Early life
Goddard studied theology at St Chad's College, Durham, and graduated from Durham University with a Bachelor of Arts (BA) degree in 1969. He then gained a Diploma in Theology (DipTh).

Ordained ministry
Goddard was ordained in the Church of England as a deacon in 1970 and as a priest in 1971. He began his ordained ministry as a curate at St John's Southbank before continuing as a curate at Cayton and Eastfield (Scarborough) under the guidance of Alan A. Millar. He then held two incumbencies in Middlesbrough and became the rural dean. From 1988 to 1992 he was vice principal of Edinburgh Theological College and then rector of Ribbleton before his ordination to the episcopate.

Goddard was consecrated a bishop on 7 December 2000 by David Hope, Archbishop of York. On 9 December 2000, he was installed as Bishop of Burnley, a suffragan bishop in the Diocese of Blackburn.

Goddard retired on 19 July 2014.

Views
He has expressed the belief (2012) that there are no totally rural parishes in the Diocese of Blackburn, which includes large swathes of farming communities and extensive rural areas such as the Forest of Bowland. This is because most of the rural areas in the villages have residents whose involvement in commercial, academic, professional and urban matters reflect a more suburban character.

At the November 2012 meeting of the General Synod of the Church of England, Goddard was one of the three members of the House of Bishops who voted against the ordination of women as bishops.

Roman Catholic Church
It was announced on 21 May 2021 that Goddard would be received into the Roman Catholic Church on the Feast of Pentecost, 23 May, by the auxiliary bishop of Liverpool. On 2 April 2022, he was ordained to the priesthood by Tom Williams during a service at Liverpool Metropolitan Cathedral; and serves as a priest of the Archdiocese of Liverpool.

Personal life
Goddard is a keen narrowboater. He is married to Vivienne. Together they have two children; Michael and Gareth.

Styles
 The Reverend John Goddard (1971–1987)
 The Reverend Canon John Goddard (1987–2000)
 The Right Reverend John Goddard (2000–2021)
 The Reverend John Goddard (2022-present)

References

1947 births
Alumni of St Chad's College, Durham
21st-century Church of England bishops
Bishops of Burnley
Living people
Anglican bishop converts to Roman Catholicism
Married Roman Catholic clergy